Ereyge Fahun (eng: after that night) is a 2006 Maldivian supernatural psychological horror thriller film written and directed by Ali Seezan. Produced by Apollo Entertainment, the film stars Ali Seezan and Zeenath Abbas in pivotal roles. Majority of the scenes were shot in the Home for People with Special Needs, located in K. Guraidhoo. The film was an unofficial remake of the American supernatural psychological horror thriller film Gothika (2003) directed by Mathieu Kassovitz and written by Sebastian Gutierrez.

Premise
Dr. Najfa (Zeenath Abbas), a psychiatrist diagnosing a patient, believes that she is possessed by a spirit and becomes personally invested in the case. One stormy night, when she was riding back home, Najfa meets with a car accident while trying to avoid hitting a girl, who turns out to be a ghost. The ghost possess Najfa while she was trying to help the girl. Najfa wakes up as a patient in the same hospital where she works and is diagnosed by her colleague, Dr. Fazal. It was revealed that Najfa has no memory of any event that happened in her life after the car accident. She is horrified on discovering that her husband, Dr. Munawwar was brutally murdered and Najfa is the prime suspect of the crime.

Cast 
 Ali Seezan as Dr. Fazal
 Zeenath Abbas as Dr. Najfa
 Abdulla Munaz as Dr. Munaz
 Ibrahim Wisan as Dr. Munawwar
 Hamid Ali as Najfa's father
 Aisha as Neena
 Shaliya as Aminath Laila
 Shifan as Shifan

Soundtrack

References

Maldivian thriller films
2006 films
Remakes of Maldivian films
Films directed by Ali Seezan